The Honda OSM (Open Study Model) is a concept car that was revealed at the 2008 London Motor Show. The concept vehicle was designed by Honda's R&D facility in Offenbach, Germany. The lightweight roadster design was to showcase that Honda has the capability of producing a low-emissions car that is sporty and fun to drive. Honda has announced that it has no plan for a production model, despite being speculated by car enthusiasts as a preview for a potential replacement of the aging Honda S2000 convertible. It was also speculated that the similar size and design language hinted at a convertible version of the Honda CR-Z, which was then yet to be released.

Design and features 
The dashboard design concept was inspired by the Honda civic (eighth generation), more specifically the European hatchback model, and became a consistent design choice for later Honda sedan models in the following years such as the Honda Insight (second generation) in 2010 and Honda Civic (ninth generation) in 2011.

Gallery

References

OSM